Herman Hunt born 10 May 1983 in Auckland, New Zealand is a rugby union player for the Queensland Reds in the Super Rugby competition. Hunt's position of choice is as a prop.

References

External links
Queensland Reds profile

1983 births
Living people
Rugby union props
Rugby union players from Auckland
Queensland Reds players